Senator Terry may refer to:

P. S. Terry (1876–1936), Missouri State Senate
Rex Terry (1888–1964), South Dakota State Senate
Walter Terry (1909–1977), Wisconsin State Senate
William L. Terry (1850–1917), Arkansas State Senate